was a town located in Hashima District, Gifu Prefecture, Japan.

On January 1, 2006, Yanaizu was merged into the expanded city of Gifu and no longer exists as an independent municipality.

Education

When the city was independent it housed a North Korean school, Gifu Korean Elementary and Junior High School (岐阜朝鮮初中級学校).

References

External links
Yanaizu official website  (Archive)
Gifu city official website 

Dissolved municipalities of Gifu Prefecture